The John Muir Wilderness is a wilderness area that extends along the crest of the Sierra Nevada of California for , in the Inyo and Sierra National Forests.  Established in 1964 by the Wilderness Act and named for naturalist John Muir, it encompasses . The wilderness lies along the eastern escarpment of the Sierra from near Mammoth Lakes and Devils Postpile National Monument in the north, to Cottonwood Pass near Mount Whitney in the south. The wilderness area also spans the Sierra crest north of Kings Canyon National Park, and extends on the west side of the park down to the Monarch Wilderness.

Geography and geology
The peaks are typically made of granite from the Sierra Nevada Batholith, and are dramatically shaped by glacial action. The southernmost glacier in the United States, the Palisade Glacier, is contained within the wilderness area. Notable east-side glaciated canyons are drained by Rock, McGee and Bishop Creeks.

Other notable mountains in the wilderness area include the Palisades and Mount Humphreys. Mount Muir is located 2 miles south of Mount Whitney. Mount Williamson is the second-highest peak in the wilderness, at : it rises in one continuous sweep of granite from the floor of the Owens Valley to a peak just east of the main range.

Ecology

The John Muir Wilderness contains the largest contiguous area above  in the continental United States. It contains large areas of subalpine meadows and fellfields above , containing stands of whitebark and foxtail pine. Below the lodgepole forest is forest dominated by Jeffrey pine.

Common animals in the wilderness include yellow-bellied marmots, pikas, golden-mantled ground squirrels, Clark's nutcrackers, golden trout, and black bears. The wilderness area also includes California bighorn sheep zoological areas, which are set aside for the protection of the species.

Recreation

The wilderness contains  of hiking trails, including the John Muir Trail and the Pacific Crest Trail, which run through the wilderness from north to south. The John Muir Wilderness is the second most-visited wilderness in the United States, and quotas for overnight use have been implemented on virtually all trailheads.

Lakes

 Dingleberry Lake
 Disappointment Lake
 Hell for Sure Lake
 Loch Leven
 Lake of the Lone Indian
 Mills Lake
 Nüümü Hu Hupi
 Pee Wee Lake
 Lake Virginia

See also
 Bibliography of the Sierra Nevada, for further reading

References

External links 

 Wilderness.net
 TopoQuest map

Wilderness areas of California
Protected areas of the Sierra Nevada (United States)
Inyo National Forest
Sierra National Forest
Protected areas of Fresno County, California
Protected areas of Inyo County, California
Protected areas of Madera County, California
Protected areas of Mono County, California
Protected areas established in 1964
1964 establishments in California